Phacellus fulguratus is a species of beetle in the family Cerambycidae. It was described by Monné in 1979. It is known from Brazil.

References

Phacellini
Beetles described in 1979